This is a list of the stained glass works of Christopher Whall (1849–1924) in cathedrals and minsters, reflecting Whall's intent to reflect the inspiration of nature in this art.

Whall's other works include:
 Gloucester Cathedral
 War Memorial windows
 Works in Scotland

Works in cathedrals and minsters

Gallery

References

Christopher Whall
Lists of stained glass works